Elizabeth Keenan is an American set decorator. She was nominated for an Academy Award in the category Best Production Design for the film News of the World.

Selected filmography 
 News of the World (2020; co-nominated with David Crank)

References

External links 

Living people
Place of birth missing (living people)
Year of birth missing (living people)
American set decorators